The 1995 IIHF European Women Championships were held between March 20–31, 1995. Continuing with the format from 1993, the Elite division Pool A, consisted of six teams, while the five teams that competed in 1993 were joined by Russia and Slovakia making their debut appearances, while the Netherlands returned for the first time since 1991.

The Pool A tournament was held in Riga, Latvia, while the expanded Pool B took place in Odense and Esbjerg in Denmark

European Championship Group A

Teams & format

Six teams completed in Pool A, with Latvia joining the group after winning the 1993 Pool B tournament. The teams were:

In a change to the 1993 format, the group system was abolished (as were the final games) and it was replaced with a single round robin between the teams, with the highest ranked team winning the Championship.

Final round

Standings

Results

Champions

European Championship Group B

Teams & format

The eight teams that competed in Pool B were:

The teams were split into two groups of four teams as below. At the end of the group stage, the teams would play the team that finished in the same position in the opposite group in a playoff match, i.e. Winner of Group A played Winner of Group B for the Gold Medal.

First round

Group 1

Standings

Results

Group 2

Standings

Results

Playoff round

Consolation round 7–8 place

Consolation round 5–6 place

Match for third place

Final

Final standings

See also
IIHF European Women Championships

External links
 Hockey Archives - Championnats d'Europe féminins 1995 

IIHF European Women Championships
Euro
1995
1995
Sports competitions in Riga
1995 in Latvian women's sport
1990s in Riga
1994–95 in Latvian ice hockey
1994–95 in Danish ice hockey
Sport in Odense
Sport in Esbjerg
March 1995 sports events in Europe
Ice hockey in Riga